Mill Creek (also known as Otter Creek)  is a  long tributary of the Delaware River and is one of six streams in Bucks County, Pennsylvania by the same name. Mill Creek rises just east of Core Creek Park in Middletown Township and reaches its confluence at the Delaware River's 118.87 river mile in Bristol Borough.

History
In 1885, the "Atlas of Properties Near the Philadelphia and Trenton Railroad" by G.M. Hopkins, give Mill Creek shows the stream from its source to the confluence with Queen Anne Creek (Mill Creek) as Mill Creek, but, below that as Otter Creek. Some modern maps show Mill Creek all the way to the Delaware except that the estuary itself is labeled as Otter Creek.

The east branch of Mill Creek is also known locally as Black Ditch Creek.

Lake Magnolia was originally a soil borrow site during the Pennsylvania Turnpike construction decades ago.

Silver Lake appears to have been created around 1701 after a dam was built in 1687 to power a mill in Bristol. Due to the rust-colored water, baths were built beginning in 1773 and completed in 1801 as it was thought to cure many diseases. Silver Lake has been dredged a number of times to remove silt.

Statistics
The Geographic Name Information System I.D. is 1181137, U.S. Department of the Interior Geological Survey I.D. is 02916.

Course
Then it turns to the south for a distance to the Mill Creek Valley Park. Making an S-bend, at the 5.14 river mile, it then joins with Queen Anne Creek then flows south until its adjacent to Interstate 276 Pennsylvania Turnpike where it makes a hard left at the 3.07 river mile to flow east into the Black Ditch Park where meets with the east branch of Mill Creek.

The east branch rises with two branches near the Falls Township Lake. After a short distance to the southwest, it meets a branch that connects with the Pennsylvania Canal (Delaware Division), then continues variously south and southeast to its confluence with the west branch in the Black Ditch Park.

Named Tributaries
 Queen Anne Creek
 East Branch Mill Creek

Municipalities
Mill Creek, main branch
Bristol Borough
Bristol Township
Mill Creek, western branch
Bristol Township
Middletown Township
Mill Creek, eastern branch
Bristol Township
Falls Township

Public Parks
Main Branch
Silver Lake County Park
Black Ditch Park
western branch
Mill Creek County Park

Crossings

See also
List of rivers of Pennsylvania
List of rivers of the United States
List of Delaware River tributaries

References

Rivers of Bucks County, Pennsylvania
Rivers of Pennsylvania
Tributaries of the Delaware River